Samuel Dog (born 13 February 1985) is a French football midfielder.

References

1985 births
Living people
French footballers
French sportspeople of Senegalese descent
Royale Union Saint-Gilloise players
K.M.S.K. Deinze players
R. Olympic Charleroi Châtelet Farciennes players
Royal Excel Mouscron players
Iris Club de Croix players
FC Progrès Niederkorn players
FC Rodange 91 players
Association football midfielders
Challenger Pro League players
French expatriate footballers
Expatriate footballers in Belgium
French expatriate sportspeople in Belgium
Expatriate footballers in Luxembourg
French expatriate sportspeople in Luxembourg